w00w00 (pronounced whoo-whoo) was a computer security think tank founded in 1996 and still active until the early 2000s. Although this group was not well known outside Information security circles, its participants have spawned more than a dozen IT companies. The two most famous examples are WhatsApp, the messaging service, and Napster, the pioneering file-sharing company.

Participants
The official website, explicitly states "there are no members only participants," which at one point included over 30 active participants and spanned 12 countries on five continents.

The following is a list of some of w00w00's participants:

Notable companies
A number of well known companies have been established by its participants.

 Arbor Networks
 Napster
 nmap
 WhatsApp

References

External links
 

Hacker groups